The Wellington Cenotaph, also known as the Wellington Citizens' War Memorial, is a war memorial located on the intersection of Lambton Quay and Bowen Street in Wellington, New Zealand. It commemorates the war dead of the two world wars. The cenotaph is listed by Heritage New Zealand and it is the city's focus for the annual Anzac Day commemorations

History
It was unveiled on Anzac Day (25 April) 1931 to commemorate the New Zealand dead of World War I. It features two wings decorated with relief sculptures, and the central cenotaph is topped with a bronze figure on horseback, all carried out by Richard Gross. Two bronze lions and a series of bronze friezes were later added in commemoration of World War II. On 18 March 1982, it was registered as a Category I historic place with registration number 215. It is a focus of Anzac Day commemorations in the city.

The souvenir programme for the dedication says the mounted figure was entitled 'The Will to Peace', and is described thus:
Pegasus spurning underfoot the victor's spoils of war and rising into the heavens, enabl[ing] his rider to emerge from the deluge of blood and tears, and to receive the great spiritual assurance of peace.

On 2 September 2013, new plans for the cenotaph were presented including a new staircase and water feature up to the Parliament Buildings. The works also include repairs to the cenotaph surface materials and creation of a square to create a ceremonial space. The Wellington Sculpture Trust commissioned Joe Sheehan to install Walk the Line, a line of nephrite discs tracing the line of the Waipiro Stream, which flowed from Bowen St to the foreshore.

In 2015 the Wellington Anzac Day citizen's wreath-laying ceremony was held at the upgraded cenotaph.

References

External links

Cenotaph (Wellington, N.Z.) – Te Puna Mātauranga o Aotearoa / The National Library of New Zealand

World War I memorials in New Zealand
Cenotaph
Heritage New Zealand Category 1 historic places in the Wellington Region
Cenotaphs in New Zealand
Tourist attractions in Wellington City
1930s architecture in New Zealand
Outdoor sculptures in New Zealand
Wellington Central, Wellington